Pieces of a Dream is a greatest hits album by American singer Anastacia. It was released on November 7, 2005, by Epic Records. The album includes singles from her first three studio albums, Not That Kind (2000), Freak of Nature (2001), and Anastacia (2004), as well as four new songs (two duets and two solo songs) and a megamix of her greatest hits. Only two of Anastacia's singles—"Boom", the official 2002 FIFA World Cup anthem, and "Love Is a Crime", from the soundtrack to the 2002 film Chicago—were omitted from the album, but are included as remixes on the special edition of the album.

In April 2007, Pieces of a Dream re-entered the UK Albums Chart at number 74. The album was reissued on October 17, 2008, containing the same track listing and new artwork.

Track listing

Notes
  signifies an additional producer

Charts

Weekly charts

Year-end charts

Certifications

References

2005 greatest hits albums
2005 remix albums
Albums produced by Dallas Austin
Albums produced by Glen Ballard
Albums produced by John Shanks
Albums produced by Ric Wake
Albums produced by Sam Watters
Anastacia albums
Epic Records compilation albums
Epic Records remix albums